Jeffrey Paul Cutlip (born June 15, 1949) is an American serial killer and rapist who murdered two women and a teenage girl in the Portland metropolitan area of Oregon between 1975 and 1993. He confessed to the murders in 2012, and was sentenced to life imprisonment the following year.

Criminal career 
In 1982, Cutlip entered a home of a woman, gagged and tied her up, and sexually assaulted her for six hours. He was soon caught, convicted of sodomy and first-degree burglary, and labelled a sex offender. Seven months after his 1993 release from prison, he robbed two people while armed with a shotgun. He was arrested again and sent back to prison for six years. In 2000, Cutlip was paroled again; However, he failed to register as a sex offender and left Oregon. In 2004, he was arrested again after coming back to Oregon to reinstate his Social Security disability benefits. Cutlip was released from prison again in December 2004, but sent back six months later after he groped a teenage girl in Northeast Portland.

Cutlip served two more years in prison until he was released again. In 2008, he left the state again after violating his parole conditions. One week later, he was caught in Bakersfield, California, and sent back to prison until his release on July 28, 2010. In January 2011, Cutlip left Portland again and traveled to Texas.

Murders 
In 1975, Cutlip entered the apartment of 44-year-old Marlene Claire Carlson. Upon opening her unlocked door, he found Carlson sleeping on her bed. Cutlip then pounced on her and demanded sex. When Carlson refused, he attempted to smother her with a pillow. When that didn't work, he strangled Carlson to death with a telephone cord. He then sexually assaulted her corpse. Carlson was last seen alive on July 30, 1975, but her body wasn't found until August 7 of that year. Cutlip was a tenant in the same building, but was never questioned by the police.

On April 4, 1977, Cutlip drowned Julie Marie Bennett, 15, to death in Johnson Creek. Cutlip met Bennett earlier that day at Johnson Creek Park. At about 4:00 p.m., the two went to a Corner Pantry Store where they bought beer and cigarettes. Cutlip then lured her to his cabin, where he forced her to the ground, tied her hands around her back, and raped her for nearly two hours. After Bennett threatened to call the police, he took her back to the park and attempted to suffocate her. When he was unsuccessful, he pushed her head into the creek and held her underwater until she stopped breathing. He then dragged her body to the east side of the creek.

A friend with Bennett that day became worried after she didn't return to the park. The friend alerted Bennett's father, and they began to search for her. Bennett's purse was soon found in bushes at the park, but her body was not discovered until two days later. Investigators believed her death resulted from an accidental drowning, but locals believed that Cutlip was responsible for her death – causing him to move out of the neighborhood.

On July 21, 1993, the body of Nielene Loribell Doll, 33, was discovered by a jogger off Southeast Bull Run Road near Sandy. Cutlip claimed Doll went home with him after they used methamphetamine together at a Portland bar. He then asked to tie her up for sex but she refused. After a struggle, Cutlip strangled her to death. He later attempted to sexually abuse her corpse. Cutlip then placed Doll's body in the trunk of her car, dumped it, and left her car in a Fred Meyer parking-lot.

Apprehension and incarceration 
In July 2012, Cutlip called the police from Brownsville, Texas, and confessed to murdering four women, although police were only able to confirm three of these murders. Cutlip was then arrested and held without bond in Portland, Oregon. In 2013, Cutlip was sentenced to life in prison without parole after he plead guilty to two counts of murder and one count of aggravated murder. He currently resides at Two Rivers Correctional Institution in Umatilla, Oregon.

References 

1949 births
20th-century American criminals
21st-century American criminals
American male criminals
American murderers of children
American people convicted of murder
American people convicted of sodomy
American people convicted of theft
American prisoners sentenced to life imprisonment
American rapists
American serial killers
Living people
Male serial killers
Necrophiles
Prisoners sentenced to life imprisonment by Oregon
Violence against women in the United States